The 2022 All-SEC football team consists of American football players selected to the All-Southeastern Conference (SEC) chosen by the Associated Press (AP) and the conference coaches for the 2022 Southeastern Conference football season.

Georgia won the conference, defeating LSU 50–30 in the SEC Championship.

Tennessee quarterback Hendon Hooker was voted the conference's Offensive Player of the Year (AP and Coaches). Alabama outside linebacker Will Anderson Jr. was voted the Defensive Player of the Year (AP and Coaches) for the second year in a row. Georgia placekicker Jack Podlesny was named the SEC Special Teams Player of the Year. Ole Miss running back Quinshon Judkins was voted SEC Newcomer/Freshman of the Year (AP and Coaches). Kirby Smart of Georgia was voted SEC Coach of the Year (AP and Coaches) for the third time.

Offensive selections

Quarterbacks 

 Hendon Hooker, Tennessee (AP-1, Coaches-1)
 Bryce Young, Alabama (AP-2)
 Stetson Bennett, Georgia (Coaches-2)

Running backs 

 Quinshon Judkins, Ole Miss (AP-1, Coaches-1)
 Devon Achane, Texas A&M (AP-2, Coaches-1)
 Raheim Sanders, Arkansas (AP-1, Coaches-2)
 Jahmyr Gibbs, Alabama (AP-2, Coaches-2)

Wide receivers 

 Jalin Hyatt, Tennessee (AP-1, Coaches-1)
 Dominic Lovett, Missouri (AP-1, Coaches-2)
 Antwane Wells Jr., South Carolina (AP-2, Coaches-1)
 Ladd McConkey, Georgia (Coaches-2)
 Jonathan Mingo, Ole Miss (Coaches-2)
 Will Sheppard, Vanderbilt (AP-2)

Centers 

 Ricky Stomberg, Arkansas (AP-1, Coaches-1)
 Sedrick Van Pran, Georgia (AP-2, Coaches-2)

Offensive line 

 O'Cyrus Torrence, Florida (AP-1, Coaches-1)
 Darnell Wright, Tennessee (AP-1, Coaches-1)
 Emil Ekiyor Jr, Alabama (AP-1, Coaches-1)
 Warren McClendon, Georgia (Coaches-1)
 Broderick Jones, Georgia (AP-1)
 Nick Broeker, Ole Miss (Coaches-2)
 Javion Cohen, Alabama (Coaches-2)
 Tyler Steen, Alabama (Coaches-2)
 Jovaughn Gwyn, South Carolina (Coaches-2)
 Will Campbell, LSU (Coaches-2)
 Dalton Wagner, Arkansas (AP-2)
 Javon Foster, Missouri (AP-2)
 Beaux Limmer, Arkansas (AP-2)
 Ethan White, Florida (AP-2)

Tight ends 

 Brock Bowers, Georgia (AP-1, Coaches-1)
 Darnell Washington, Georgia (AP-2, Coaches-2)

Defensive selections

Defensive ends 

 BJ Ojulari, LSU (AP-1, Coaches-1)
 Derick Hall, Auburn (AP-2, Coaches-1)
 Isaiah McGuire, Missouri (AP-1, Coaches-2)
 Byron Young, Tennessee (AP-2, Coaches-1)
 Tyrus Wheat, Mississippi State (Coaches-2)

Defensive tackles 

 Jalen Carter, Georgia (AP-1, Coaches-1)
 Byron Young, Alabama (AP-2)
 Mekhi Wingo, LSU(AP-2, Coaches-2)
 Nazir Stackhouse, Georgia (Coaches-2)
 Deone Walker, Kentucky (AP-2)

Linebackers 

 Will Anderson Jr., Alabama (AP-1, Coaches-1)
 Drew Sanders, Arkansas (AP-1, Coaches-1)
 Henry To'oTo'o, Alabama (Coaches-1)
 Harold Perkins, LSU, (AP-1, Coaches-2)
 Nathaniel Watson, Mississippi State (AP-2, Coaches-2)
 Bumper Pool, Arkansas (Coaches-2)
 Jamon Dumas-Johnson, Georgia (AP-2)
 Ty'Ron Hopper, Missouri  (AP-2)

Defensive backs 

 Emmanuel Forbes, Mississippi State (AP-1, Coaches-1)
 Kool-Aid McKinstry, Alabama (AP-1, Coaches-1)
 Christopher Smith II, Georgia (AP-1, Coaches-1)
 Antonio Johnson, Texas A&M (AP-1, Coaches-2)
 Jordan Battle, Alabama (AP-2, Coaches-1)
 Kelee Ringo, Georgia (AP-2, Coaches-2)
 Keidron Smith, Kentucky (Coaches-2)
 Dwight McGlothern, Arkansas (Coaches-2)
 D.J. James, Auburn (AP-2)
 Brian Branch, Alabama (AP-2)

Special teams

Kickers 

 Jack Podlesny, Georgia (AP-1, Coaches-1)
 Will Reichard, Alabama (AP-2, Coaches-2)

Punters 

 Kai Kroger, South Carolina (AP-1, Coaches-1)
 Nik Constantinou, Texas A&M (AP-2, Coaches-2)

All purpose/return specialist 

 Devon Achane, Texas A&M (Coaches-1)
 Lideatrick Griffin, Mississippi State (AP-1)
 Jahmyr Gibbs, Alabama (AP-2, Coaches-2)

Key 
Bold = Consensus first-team selection by both the coaches and AP

AP = Associated Press

Coaches = Selected by the SEC coaches

See also 

 2022 Southeastern Conference football season
 2022 College Football All-America Team
 Southeastern Conference football individual awards

References

All-Southeastern Conference
All-SEC football teams